The Yeoman Subdivision is a railroad line owned by CSX Transportation in Florida. It runs along CSX’s S Line from Zephyrhills south to just east of Tampa via Plant City for a total of 31.2 miles. 

The north end of the line connects to the Wildwood Subdivision and the south end connects to the Tampa Terminal Subdivision.  It also connects with the Plant City Subdivision and Lakeland Subdivision (the A Line) in Plant City, and with the Valrico Subdivision (which carries Bone Valley traffic) in Valrico.

The Yeoman Subdivision and the Wildwood Subdivision (which both run along CSX’s S Line) together are CSX’s main freight route through Peninsular Florida.  Passenger service was discontinued completely in 2004 when Amtrak truncated the Palmetto to Savannah, Georgia.

The Yeoman Subdivision runs through the middle of Plant City, where it crosses CSX's other main line, the A Line (Lakeland Subdivision).  This junction, known as Plant City Interlocking, is a particularly busy junction since all trains to and from Tampa must pass through this point.  A train viewing platform is located at the junction for rail enthusiasts to observe passing trains.  The platform is part of the Robert W. Willaford Railroad Museum which operates in the Plant City Union Depot.

History

The Yeoman Subdivision was built in 1890 by the Florida Central and Peninsular Railroad.  The line would later become the main line of the Seaboard Air Line Railroad, who acquired the FC&P, in 1903.  The Seaboard Air Line would designate this segment of the main line from Coleman to Tampa (along with track from Tampa to St. Petersburg) as the Tampa Subdivision.

The Seaboard Air Line merged with the Atlantic Coast Line Railroad in 1967 with the merged company becoming CSX Transportation by 1986.  Seaboard Air Line track north of Zephyrhills was abandoned in the wake of the merger and the remaining line to the south was renamed the Yeoman Subdivision.  Current track north of Zephyrhills was previously the Atlantic Coast Line's Vitis—Tampa Line.  The Yeoman Subdivision west of Tampa to St. Petersburg was later redesignated as the Clearwater Subdivision after Seaboard Coast Line became CSX.

See also
 List of CSX Transportation lines

References

CSX Transportation lines
Florida railroads
Central Florida
Transportation in Hillsborough County, Florida
Transportation in Pasco County, Florida
1890 establishments in Florida